Johann Konrad von Reinach-Hirtzbach (1657–1737) was the Prince-Bishop of Basel from 1705 to 1737.

Biography

Johann Konrad von Reinach-Hirtzbach was born in Michelbach-le-Haut on 28 August 1657, the son of Hans Diebold Freiherr von Reinach-Hirtzbach (d. 1702) and his wife Anna Maria Eva von Freiin von Reinach-Steinbrunnborn (d. 1702).

He was educated at the Jesuit high school in Porrentruy from 1673 to 1678.  He was ordained as a priest on 20 September 1678.  He was then sent to the Collegium Germanicum in Rome, where he studied theology and philosophy.  He was made a canon in 1681, and in 1704, he became the dean of Basel Münster.

On 11 July 1705 the cathedral chapter of Basel Münster elected him to be the new Prince-Bishop of Basel, with Pope Clement XI confirming this appointment on 5 September 1705.  He was subsequently consecrated as a bishop by Vincenzo Bichi.

Johann Konrad is generally considered the first absolutist ruler of the Prince-Bishopric of Basel.  He instituted administrative centralization, which was ultimately thwarted by popular resistance, but which paved the way for more modern management techniques in the future.

In 1724, Johann Konrad suffered a riding accident, which left him with a disability for the rest of his life.  As such, his younger brother, Johann Baptist von Reinach-Hirtzbach (1669–1734), was selected as his coadjutor bishop, though Johann Baptist never became Prince-Bishop because he predeceased Johann Konrad.

Johann Konrad died on 19 March 1737.

References

1657 births
1737 deaths
Prince-Bishops of Basel